XHPTOJ-FM is a radio station on 91.1 FM in Puerto Vallarta, Jalisco, Mexico. It is owned by Radiópolis operated by GlobalMedia and carries its Los 40 pop format.

History
XHPTOJ was awarded in the IFT-4 radio auction of 2017. Televisa Radio paid 52.4 million pesos, making the station the third-most expensive in the entire auction; only XHPMAZ-FM in Mazatlán and Cancún's XHPBCQ-FM went for more money.

References

External links

Radio stations in Jalisco
Radio stations established in 2019
2019 establishments in Mexico
Radiópolis